Qareh Qayeh (also known as Karaga, Qaraga, Qarah Qayā, Qarehgeh, and Qareh Qayā) is a village in Garmeh-ye Shomali Rural District, Kandovan District, Meyaneh County, East Azerbaijan Province, Iran. At the 2006 census, its population was 100, in 24 families.

References 

Populated places in Meyaneh County